Captive breeding, also known as captive propagation, is the process of plants or animals in controlled environments, such as wildlife reserves, zoos, botanic gardens, and other conservation facilities. It is sometimes employed to help species that are being threatened by the effects of human activities such as climate change, habitat loss, fragmentation, overhunting or fishing, pollution, predation, disease, and parasitism. 

For many species, relatively little is known about the conditions needed for successful breeding.  Information about a species' reproductive biology may be critical to the success of a captive breeding program. In some cases a captive breeding program can save a species from extinction, but for success, breeders must consider many factors—including  genetic, ecological, behavioral, and ethical issues. Most successful attempts involve the cooperation and coordination of many institutions.

History 

Captive breeding techniques began with the first human domestication of animals such as goats, and plants like wheat, at least 10,000 years ago. These practices were expanded with the rise of the first zoos, which started as royal menageries such as the one at Hierakonpolis, capital in the Predynastic Period of Egypt.

The first actual captive breeding programs were only started in the 1960s. These programs, such as the Arabian Oryx breeding program from the Phoenix Zoo in 1962, were aimed at the reintroduction of these species into the wild. These programs expanded under The Endangered Species Act of 1973 of the Nixon Administration which focused on protecting endangered species and their habitats to preserve biodiversity. Since then, research and conservation have been housed in zoos, such as the Institute for Conservation Research at the San Diego Zoo founded in 1975 and expanded in 2009, which have contributed to the successful conservation efforts of species such as the Hawaiian Crow.

Coordination
The breeding of species of conservation concern is coordinated by cooperative breeding programs containing international studbooks and coordinators, who evaluate the roles of individual animals and institutions from a global or regional perspective. These studbooks contain information on birth date, gender, location, and lineage (if known), which helps determine survival and reproduction rates, number of founders of the population, and inbreeding coefficients. A species coordinator reviews the information in studbooks and determines a breeding strategy that would produce most advantageous offspring.

If two compatible animals are found at different zoos, the animals may be transported for mating, but this is stressful, which could in turn make mating less likely. However, this is still a popular breeding method among European zoological organizations. Artificial fertilization (by shipping semen) is another option, but male animals can experience stress during semen collection, and the same goes for females during the artificial insemination procedure. Furthermore, this approach yields lower-quality semen, because shipping requires extending the life of the sperm for the transit time.

There are regional programmes for the conservation of endangered species:
Americas: Species Survival Plan SSP (Association of Zoos and Aquariums AZA, Canadian Association of Zoos and Aquariums CAZA)
Europe: European Endangered Species Programme EEP (European Association of Zoos and Aquaria EAZA)
Australasia: Australasian Species Management Program ASMP (Zoo and Aquarium Association ZAA)
Africa: African Preservation Program APP (African Association of Zoological Gardens and Aquaria PAAZAB)
Japan: Conservation activities of Japanese Association of Zoos and Aquariums JAZA
South Asia: Conservation activities of South Asian Zoo Association for Regional Cooperation SAZARC
South East Asia: Conservation activities of South East Asian Zoos Association SEAZA

Challenges

Genetics
The objective of many captive populations is to hold similar levels of  genetic diversity to what is found in wild populations. As captive populations are usually small and maintained in artificial environments, genetics factors such as adaptation, inbreeding and loss of diversity can be a major concern.

Domestication adaptations 
Adaptive differences between plant and animal populations arise due to variations in environmental pressures. In the case of captive breeding prior to reintroduction into the wild, it's possible for species to evolve to adapt to the captive environment, rather than their natural environment.[11] Reintroducing a plant or animal to an environment dissimilar to the one they were originally from can cause fixation of traits that may not be suited for that environment leaving the individual disadvantaged. Selection intensity, initial genetic diversity, and effective population size can impact how much the species adapts to its captive environment. Modeling works indicate that the duration of the programs (i.e., time from the foundation of the captive population to the last release event) is an important determinant of reintroduction success. Success is maximized for intermediate project duration allowing the release of a sufficient number of individuals, while minimizing the number of generations undergoing relaxed selection in captivity. Can be minimized by reducing the number of generations in captivity, minimizing selection for captive adaptations by creating environment similar to natural environment and maximizing the number of immigrants from wild populations.

Genetic diversity 
One consequence of small captive population size is the increased impact of genetic drift, where genes have the potential to fix or disappear completely by chance, thereby reducing genetic diversity. Other factors that can impact genetic diversity in a captive population are bottlenecks and initial population size. Bottlenecks, such as rapid decline in the population or a small initial population impacts genetic diversity. Loss can be minimized by establishing a population with a large enough number of founders to genetically represent the wild population, maximize population size, maximize ratio of effective population size to actual population size, and minimize the number of generations in captivity.

Inbreeding 
Inbreeding is when organisms mate with closely related individuals, lowering heterozygosity in a population. Although inbreeding can be relatively common, when it results in a reduction in fitness it is known as inbreeding depression. The detrimental effects of inbreeding depression are especially prevalent in smaller populations and can therefore be extensive in captive populations. To make these populations the most viable, it is important to monitor and reduce the effects of deleterious allele expression caused by inbreeding depression and to restore genetic diversity. Comparing inbred populations against non-inbred or less-inbred populations can help determine the extent of detrimental effects if any are present. Closely monitoring the possibility of inbreeding within the captive bred population is also key to the success of reintroduction into the species' native habitat.

Outbreeding 
Outbreeding is when organisms mate with unrelated individuals, increasing heterozygosity in a population. Although new diversity is often beneficial, if there are large genetic differences between the two individuals it can result in outbreeding depression. This is a reduction in fitness, similar to that of inbreeding depression, but arises from a number of different mechanisms, including taxonomic issues, chromosomal differences, sexual incompatibility, or adaptive differences between the individuals. A common cause is chromosomal ploidy differences and hybridization between individuals leading to sterility. The best example is in the orangutan, which, prior to taxonomic revisions in the 1980s would be commonly mated in captive populations producing hybrid orangutans with lower fitness . If chromosomal ploidy is ignored during reintroduction, restoration efforts would fail due to sterile hybrids in the wild. If there are large genetic differences between individuals originally from distant populations, those individuals should only be bred in circumstances where no other mates exist.

Behavior changes
Captive breeding can contribute to changes in behavior in animals that have been reintroduced to the wild. Released animals are commonly less capable of hunting or foraging for food, which leads to starvation, possibly because the young animals spent the critical learning period in captivity. Released animals often display more risk-taking behavior and fail to avoid predators. Golden lion tamarin mothers often die in the wild before having offspring because they cannot climb and forage. This leads to continuing population declines despite reintroduction as the species are unable to produce viable offspring. Training can improve anti-predator skills, but its effectiveness varies.

Salmon bred in captivity have shown similar declines in caution and are killed by predators when young. However, salmon that were reared in an enriched environment with natural prey showed less risk-taking behaviors and were more likely to survive.

A study on mice has found that after captive breeding had been in place for multiple generations and these mice were "released" to breed with wild mice, that the captive-born mice bred amongst themselves instead of with the wild mice. This suggests that captive breeding may affect mating preferences, and has implications for the success of a reintroduction program.

Human mediated recovery of species can unintentionally promote maladaptive behaviors in wild populations. In 1980 the number of wild Chatham Island Black Robins was reduced to a single mating pair. Intense management of populations helped the population recover and by 1998 there were 200 individuals. During recovery scientists observed "rim laying" an egg laying habit where individuals laid eggs on the rim of the nest instead of the center. Rim laid eggs never hatched. To combat this land managers pushed the egg to the center of the nest, which greatly increased reproduction. However, by allowing this maladaptive trait to persist, over half the population were now rim layers. Genetic studies found that this was an autosomal dominant mendelian trait that was selected for due to human intervention

Successes

The De Wildt Cheetah and Wildlife Centre, established in South Africa in 1971, has a cheetah captive breeding program. Between 1975 and 2005, 242 litters were born with a total of 785 cubs. The survival rate of cubs was 71.3% for the first twelve months and 66.2% for older cubs, validating the fact that cheetahs can be bred successfully (and their endangerment decreased). It also indicated that failure in other breeding habitats may be due to "poor" sperm morphology.

Przewalski’s horse, the only horse species never to have been domesticated, was recovered from the brink of extinction by a captive breeding program, and successfully reintroduced in the 1990s to the Mongolia, with more than 750 wild roaming Przewalski’s horses today.

The Galápagos tortoise population, once reaching as low in population as 12 remaining individuals, was recovered to more than 2000 today by a captive breeding program. A further 8 tortoise species were supported by captive breeding programs in the island chain. 

Wild Tasmanian devils have declined by 90% due to a transmissible cancer called Devil Facial Tumor Disease. A captive insurance population program was started, but the captive breeding rates as of 2012 were lower than they needed to be. Keeley, Fanson, Masters, and McGreevy (2012) sought to "increase our understanding of the estrous cycle of the devil and elucidate potential causes of failed male-female pairings" by examining temporal patterns of fecal progestogen and corticosterone metabolite concentrations. They found that the majority of unsuccessful females were captive-born, suggesting that if the species' survival depended solely on captive breeding, the population would probably disappear.

In 2010, the Oregon Zoo found that Columbia Basin pygmy rabbit pairings based on familiarity and preferences resulted in a significant increase in breeding success.

In 2019, researchers trying to breed captive American paddlefish and Russian sturgeon separately inadvertently bred sturddlefish - a hybrid fish between the two fish.

Methods used 

To found a captive breeding population with adequate genetic diversity, breeders usually select individuals from different source populations—ideally, at least 20-30 individuals. Founding populations for captive breeding programs have often had fewer individuals than ideal because of their threatened state, leaving them more susceptible to challenges such as inbreeding depression.

To overcome challenges of captive breeding such as adaptive differences, loss of genetic diversity, inbreeding depression, and outbreeding depression and get desired results, captive breeding programs use many monitoring methods. Artificial insemination is used to produce the desired offspring from individuals who don't mate naturally to reduce effects of mating closely related individuals such as inbreeding. Methods as seen in panda pornography allow programs to mate chosen individuals by encouraging mating behavior. As a concern in captive breeding is to minimize the effects of breeding closely related individuals, microsatellite regions from an organisms genome can be used to determine amounts of relationship among founders to minimize relatedness and pick the most distant individuals to breed. This method has successfully been used in the captive breeding of the California condor and the Guam rail. The maximum avoidance of inbreeding (MAI) scheme allows control at a group level rather than an individual level by rotating individuals between groups to avoid inbreeding.

New technologies

Assisted reproduction technology (ART): Artificial insemination 
Getting captive wild animals to breed naturally can be a difficult task. Giant pandas for example lose interest in mating once they are captured, and female giant pandas only experience estrus once a year, which only lasts for 48 to 72 hours. Many researchers have turned to artificial insemination in an attempt to increase the populations of endangered animals. It may be used for many reasons, including to overcome physical breeding difficulties, to allow a male to inseminate a much larger number of females, to control the paternity of offspring, and to avoid injury incurred during natural mating. It also creates more genetically diverse captive populations, enabling captive facilities to easily share genetic material with each other without the need to move animals. Scientist of the Justus-Liebig-University of Giessen, Germany, from the working group of Michael Lierz, developed a novel technique for semen collection and artificial insemination in parrots producing the world's first macaw by assisted reproduction

Cryopreservation 
Animal species can be preserved in gene banks, which consist of a cryogenic facilities used to store live sperm, eggs, or embryos in ultracold conditions. The Zoological Society of San Diego has established a "frozen zoo" to store frozen tissue from the world's rarest and most endangered species samples using cryopreservation techniques. At present, there has been more than 355 species, including mammals, reptiles, and birds. Cryopreservation can be performed as oocyte cryopreservation before fertilization, or as embryo cryopreservation after fertilization. Cryogenically preserved specimens can potentially be used to revive breeds that are endangered or rextinct, for breed improvement, crossbreeding, research and development. This method can be used for virtually indefinite storage of material without deterioration over a much greater time-period relative to all other methods of ex situ conservation. However, cryo-conservation can be an expensive strategy and requires long term hygienic and economic commitment for germplasms to remain viable. Cryo-conservation can also face unique challenges based on the species, as some species have a reduced survival rate of frozen germplasm, but cryobiology is a field of active research and many studies concerning plants are underway.

An example of the use of cryoconservation to prevent the extinction of a livestock breed is the case of the Hungarian Grey cattle, or Magya Szurke. Hungarian Grey cattle were once a dominant breed in southeastern Europe with a population of 4.9 million head in 1884. They were mainly used for draft power and meat. However, the population had decreased to 280,000 head by the end of World War II and eventually reached the low population of 187 females and 6 males from 1965 to 1970. The breed's decreased use was due primarily to the mechanization of agriculture and the adoption of major breeds, which yield higher milk production. The Hungarian government launched a project to preserve the breed, as it possesses valuable traits, such as stamina, calving ease, disease resistance, and easy adaptation to a variety of climates. The government program included various conservation strategies, including the cryopreservation of semen and embryos. The Hungarian government's conservation effort brought the population up to 10,310 in 2012, which shows significant improvement using cryoconservation.

Cloning 
The best current cloning techniques have an average success rate of 9.4 percent, when working with familiar species such as mice, while cloning wild animals is usually less than 1 percent successful. In 2001, a cow named Bessie gave birth to a cloned Asian gaur, an endangered species, but the calf died after two days. In 2003, a banteng was successfully cloned, followed by three African wildcats from a thawed frozen embryo. These successes provided hope that similar techniques (using surrogate mothers of another species) might be used to clone extinct species. Anticipating this possibility, tissue samples from the last bucardo (Pyrenean ibex) were frozen in liquid nitrogen immediately after it died in 2000. Researchers are also considering cloning endangered species such as the giant panda and cheetah. However, cloning of animals is opposed by animal-groups due to the number of cloned animals that suffer from malformations before they die.

Interspecific pregnancy 
A potential technique for aiding in reproduction of endangered species is interspecific pregnancy, implanting embryos of an endangered species into the womb of a female of a related species, carrying it to term. It has been used for the Spanish Ibex and Houbara bustard.

Ethical considerations 
With successes, captive-breeding programs have proven successful throughout history. Notable examples include the American black-footed ferret; in 1986, a dwindling wild population of only 18 was eventually raised to 500. A beautiful and mysterious Middle-Eastern antelope, the Arabian oryx was hunted over centuries, reducing their population by the late 1960's to merely eleven living animals; not wanting to lose such a symbolic animal of the Middle East, these individuals were rescued and donated by King Saud to the Phoenix Zoo, the San Diego Zoo and their (at the time) newly-developed,  Wild Animal Park, prior to his death in 1969. From these actions, those eleven oryx were successfully bred from the brink of extinction, and would go on to be re-released in the deserts of Jordan, Oman, Bahrain, United Arab Emirates and Qatar. Starting in 1980, the first animals were set free. Currently, the wild animals number around 1,000 individuals, with a further 6,000-7,000 in zoos and breeding centres internationally. 

While captive breeding sounds like an ideal solution for preventing endangered animals from facing serious threats of extinction there are still reasons to believe that these programs can occasionally do more harm than good. Some detrimental effects include delays in understanding optimal conditions required for reproduction, failure to reach self-sustaining levels or provide sufficient stock for release, loss of genetic diversity due to inbreeding, and poor success in reintroductions despite available captive-bred young. Although it has been proven that captive breeding programs have yielded negative genetic effects in decreasing the fitness of captive-bred organisms, there is no direct evidence to show that this negative effect also decreases the overall fitness of their wild-born descendants.

There is reason to demand for the release of animals from captivity programs for four main reasons: a lack of sufficient space due to overly successful breeding programs, closure of facilities due to financial reasons, pressure from animal rights advocacy groups, and to aid the conservation of endangered species. Additionally, there are many ethical complications to reintroducing animals born in captivity back into the wild. For example, when scientists were reintroducing a rare species of toad back into the Mallorcan wild in 1993, a potentially deadly fungus that could kill frogs and toads was unintentionally introduced. It is also important to maintain the organism’s original habitat, or replicate that specific habitat for species survival.

See also 
 Breeding in the wild
 European Endangered Species Programme (EEP)
 Ex-situ conservation
 Panda pornography
 Species Survival Plan or SSP
 World Conference on Breeding Endangered Species in Captivity as an Aid to their Survival or WCBESCAS
 ZooBorns

References 

Conservation biology
Zoology
Animals in captivity
Animal breeding